Paul Yu was a Chinese-American academic who was the President of State University of New York at Brockport (SUNY Brockport) between 1997–2004.

Early life and Education
Born in Chongqing, China, Yu moved with his family to Hong Kong in 1949 before resettling in Michigan. Yu went on to receive bachelor's, master's, and a doctorate in philosophy all from the University of Michigan.

He was the younger brother of Yu Ying-shih.

Academic career
A scholar in philosophy of language and philosophy of mind, Yu was a philosophy professor at Central Michigan University from 1969 to 1980. In the 1980-81 academic year, he was a Fulbright lecturer at the National Taiwan University. Yu returned to Central Michigan University in 1981 as chair of the philosophy department and served in that capacity until 1987, when he moved up to associate dean of the College of Arts and Sciences at Central Michigan.

From 1989 to 1991, Yu served as dean of the College of Liberal Arts and Sciences at Butler University in Indianapolis, Indiana. Yu then became vice president of academic affairs in the 1991–92 school year, then was provost and senior vice president of academic affairs from 1992 to 1997.

Yu served as external evaluator for the Chinese University of Hong Kong, National Taiwan University, and the National Science Council of the Republic of China. From 1988 to 1989, Yu served on the Michigan Council for the Humanities from 1988 to 1989. In 1990, Yu was visiting scholar at the Chinese Academy of Social Sciences (CASS) in Beijing, under the Visiting Scholars Exchange Program (VSEP) sponsored by the United States National Academy of Sciences. He also joined the Board of Directors of the American Association of University Administrators (AAUA) in 1998.

President of SUNY Brockport (1997–2004)
From 1997 to 2004, Yu was president of SUNY Brockport.

During his presidency, SUNY Brockport rose to Tier 2 within the State University of New York system. He also established the Presidential Scholarship program which attracted several top international students to the SUNY Brockport campus.

President of San Jose State University (2004)
On April 20, 2004, the California State University Board of Trustees named Yu as President of San Jose State University, effective July 15. On August 2, just three weeks after taking office, Yu resigned from San Jose State for health reasons. He returned with his family to New York and took a position with SUNY Brockport.

Death 
Yu died on December 5, 2016 at the age of 75 after battling Parkinson's disease.

References

American philosophers
2016 deaths
Presidents of campuses of the State University of New York
Year of birth missing
Educators from Chongqing
Central Michigan University faculty
Presidents of San Jose State University
Philosophers from Chongqing
Chinese emigrants to the United States
Butler University faculty
Academic staff of the National Taiwan University
Neurological disease deaths in New York (state)
Deaths from Parkinson's disease
University of Michigan College of Literature, Science, and the Arts alumni